Ade Mochtar or Ade Muhtar (born August 26, 1979) is an Indonesian footballer who currently plays for Gresik United in the Indonesia Super League.

References

External links

1979 births
Association football goalkeepers
Living people
Indonesian footballers
Liga 1 (Indonesia) players
Bontang F.C. players
Gresik United players
Indonesian Premier Division players
Persibom Bolaang Mongondow players
Persigo Gorontalo players
Persma Manado players